Ali Kahramanlı. Born on 1 January 1953, Gaziantep. President of Mersin İdmanyurdu SK from 2008 to present. He is a Gaziantep born transportation businessman who owns Kahramanlı Group.

Business
Kahramanlı is a businessman who is interested mainly in transportation. He is the owner of Kahramanlı Group. Ali Kahramanlı has inaugurated transportation services in 1970's. Kahramanlı Group first step was taken in Mersin in 1992, with the foundation of Kahramanlı International Transportation Co. Ltd. In addition to transportation services Group runs warehouse facilities, logistics and insurance services.

Sports management
He managed Mersin İdmanyurdu since September 2008 till January 2016.

Notes and references

Living people
1953 births
Turkish business executives
People from Gaziantep
Mersin İdman Yurdu